Gętomie  is a village in the administrative district of Gmina Morzeszczyn, within Tczew County, Pomeranian Voivodeship, in northern Poland. It is located within the ethnocultural region of Kociewie in the historic region of Pomerania.

The village has a population of 121.

History
Gętomie was a private church village of the monastery in Pelplin, administratively located in the Tczew County in the Pomeranian Voivodeship of the Polish Crown.

During the German occupation of Poland (World War II), the occupiers carried out expulsions of Poles, whose farms were handed over to German colonists in accordance with the Lebensraum policy.

References

Villages in Tczew County